Privy Council Office may refer to:

Privy Council Office (Canada)
Privy Council Office (United Kingdom)